New Demons is the fourth studio album by American electronicore band I See Stars, released on October 22, 2013 through Sumerian Records. The album was originally set for release on August 13, before being pushed back to September 17, and again to October 22 for unknown reasons. The album marks a progression of the sound in their previous album Digital Renegade, with Zach Johnson having a much bigger vocal role, as well as having a much more prominent EDM sound. The song "Violent Bounce" was the first single to be released. It was uploaded to YouTube via the Sumerian Records channel. "Murder Mitten" and the title track, "New Demons", were to follow. The band did performances of the song "Ten Thousand Feet" to give fans a taste of what is going to be on the rest of the album before its release. Klayton of Celldweller, Mutrix, and Razihel all provided additional programming for some of the tracks.

It is the final album to feature unclean vocalist/keyboardist Zach Johnson and rhythm guitarist Jimmy Gregerson before they were dismissed from the band in June 2015.

Background
The album had been worked on by the band immediately after their previous album, Digital Renegade, was finished. The song "Ten Thousand Feet" was the only song played from the album before it was released.

The song "Violent Bounce" was released as the first single from the album several months before the album release date, accompanied by a lyric video. The song "Murder Mitten" is written about brothers Devin and Andrew Oliver's relationship with their mother, who was an alcoholic during their childhood.

A remix version entitled New Demons (Remixes) was released on February 23, 2015. Featuring eight remixes from various producers, showcasing many styles of EDM.

Reception
The album debuted on Billboard 200 at No. 28, No. 10 on the Top Rock Albums Albums chart, selling 10,000 copies in its first week.  It has sold 47,000 copies in the United States as of June 2016.

Track listing

Personnel
I See Stars
 Brent Allen – lead guitar
 Jimmy Gregerson – rhythm guitar
 Zach Johnson – unclean vocals, keyboards, synthesizers, sequencer, programming
 Andrew Oliver – drums, percussion, backing vocals; additional clean vocals on "Murder Mitten"
 Devin Oliver – clean vocals
 Jeff Valentine – bass guitar

Production
 Jake Klein - additional writing for "Murder Mitten", "We're Not in Kansas Anymore" and "Who Am I?"
 Joey Valentine - additional writing for "Murder Mitten", "We're Not in Kansas Anymore" and "Who Am I?", additional production
 Joey Sturgis - production, engineering, mixing, mastering
 Shawn Keith - executive producer, art direction
 Nick Scott - guitars, bass and vocals engineering, guitar and bass editing
 Chuck Alkazian - drum engineering
 Josh Karpowicz - assistant drum engineering at Pearl Sound Studios, Canton, Michigan
 Jeff Dunne - drum editing
 Kacey Dodson - vocal editing
 Scott "Celldweller" Albert, Nicolò "Razihel" Arquilla and James "Mutrix" Ruehlmann - additional production
 Matt Dalton - additional production, additional gang vocals at 37 Studios, Michigan
 Dylan Kuhn - painting and wall photography at Noveltycross Productions
 Daniel McBride - album layout at McBride Design, art direction
 Unlimited Visual - band logo design
 Jonathan Weiner - band photography

Charts

References

I See Stars albums
Sumerian Records albums
2013 albums
Albums produced by Joey Sturgis